Kevin Matthews (born March 2, 1960) is an American politician who has served in the Oklahoma Senate from the 11th district since 2015. He previously served in the Oklahoma House of Representatives from the 73rd district from 2012 to 2015.

References

1960 births
Living people
21st-century American politicians
Democratic Party members of the Oklahoma House of Representatives
Democratic Party Oklahoma state senators
Politicians from Tulsa, Oklahoma
African-American state legislators in Oklahoma
21st-century African-American politicians
20th-century African-American people